The Excellence in Medicine Awards (frequently known as the Leadership Awards) are accolades presented annually by the American Medical Association Foundation to recognize excellence of a select group of physicians and medical students who exemplify the medical profession’s highest values: commitment to service, community involvement, altruism, leadership and dedication to patient care. The AMA Foundation Excellence in Medicine Awards are considered the "Oscars" within the medical community.

The awards are highly covered in the medical news world. They are also recognized widely in traditional media outlets.  Past recipients have been from diverse institutions including Harvard, Johns Hopkins, Yale, University of Colorado, UCLA, Georgetown, University of Michigan, Michigan State University, and MD Anderson Cancer Center.

Awards
 Dr. Debasish Mridha Spirit of Medicine Award: This award recognizes the work of a U.S. physician who demonstrates altruism, compassion, integrity, leadership skills and personal sacrifice while providing excellent health care to a destitute, distressed or marginalized population in an impoverished community.
Dr. Edmond and Rima Cabbabe Dedication to the Profession Award: This award recognizes the work of a physician who demonstrates active and productive improvement to the medical profession. Fatima Cody Stanford was the 2021 recipient of this award.
Pride in the Profession Award: The Pride in the Profession Awards honor caring for people. By practicing medicine in areas of challenge or crisis, or by devoting their time to volunteerism or public service, these physicians serve as the voice of patients in the United States who otherwise might not be heard. Regina Benjamin, US Surgeon General was bestowed with this award in 2009
Dr. Nathan Davis International Award in Medicine: Named for the founder of the AMA, the Dr. Nathan Davis International Award in Medicine recognizes physicians who treat, educate, and counsel patients beyond the U. S. border.
 Leadership Awards: The Leadership Awards are presented to 10 medical students and 5 early career physicians selected from across the United States to recognize their outstanding leadership in the areas of advocacy, community service and/or education. Notable recipients include Rashid Rashid, Jesse Ehrenfeld, Fatima Cody Stanford, Andrew Miller and Anand Reddi.
Jack B. McConnell, MD Award for Excellence in Volunteerism: The Jack B. McConnell, MD, Award for Excellence in Volunteerism recognizes the work of senior physicians who provide treatment to U. S. patients who lack access to health care. After a full career of practice, these physicians remain active volunteers.

References

External links
  AMA Foundation Leadership Awards
  2010 Biography of Awardees Booklet
  American Medical Association Official Website
 
 
  International Volunteers in Urology Founder Awarded the AMA's Top International Medical Service Honor
 
  Rotary International and Global Partners Honored byAMA's Inaugural Dr. Nathan Davis
 
 Third party recognition by specialty: https://web.archive.org/web/20130711060811/http://med/. umich. edu/prmc/media/newsroom/details.cfm?ID=1524
 http://newsroom.ucr. edu/news_item.html?action=page&id=2278
 https://web.archive.org/web/20070924150502/http://pn/. psychiatryonline. org/content/36/10/12.full
 http://www. asahq. org/news/asanews030810.htm
 http://pritzker. uchicago. edu/about/news/pritzkerpulse/2008spring/ama. shtml

American awards
American Medical Association